The women's  BMX competition of the cycling events at the 2015 Pan American Games will be held between July 10 and 11 at the Centennial Park Pan Am BMX Centre in Toronto, Ontario, Canada.

Schedule
All times are Eastern Standard Time (UTC−3).

Results

Time Trials

Semifinal
First 4 riders in each semifinal qualify to the final.

Final

References

Cycling at the 2015 Pan American Games
Pan
BMX at the Pan American Games